Intepirdine (INN; developmental codes SB-742457, RVT-101) is a selective 5-HT6 receptor antagonist with potential cognition, memory, and learning-enhancing effects. It was under development by GlaxoSmithKline for the treatment of Alzheimer's disease and demonstrated some preliminary efficacy in phase II clinical trials. GSK chose not to continue development and sold the rights to Axovant Sciences for $5 million in December 2014.

Results of a phase III clinical trial for the treatment of Alzheimer's disease were reported in September 2017. The trial showed no improvement over control group and Axovant lost 70% of its value upon the announcement of the trial results.

Intepirdine also entered clinical trials for dementia with Lewy bodies, also with negative results. Consequently, Axovant announced in 2018 that it has discontinued development of this drug.

References

Quinolines
Piperazines
Benzosulfones
Abandoned drugs